Cap Robert Carden (December 17, 1866 – June 13, 1935) was a U.S. Representative from Kentucky.

Born on a farm near Munfordville, Kentucky, Carden attended the rural schools and Bowling Green (Kentucky) Business and Normal School (now Western Kentucky University).  He studied law, was admitted to the bar in 1895 and commenced practice in Munfordville, Kentucky.  He also engaged in agricultural pursuits and in banking.  He was sheriff of Hart County 1887-1890.  He was elected county attorney of Hart County in 1890 and served from 1891 to 1894.  He served as master commissioner of the circuit court of Hart County 1900-1915.

Carden was elected as a Democrat to the Seventy-second, Seventy-third, and Seventy-fourth Congresses and served from March 4, 1931, until his death in Louisville, Kentucky, on June 13, 1935.  He was interred in Munfordville Cemetery, Munfordville, Kentucky.

See also
 List of United States Congress members who died in office (1900–49)

References

1866 births
1935 deaths
People from Hart County, Kentucky
Kentucky lawyers
Western Kentucky University alumni
Democratic Party members of the United States House of Representatives from Kentucky
People from Munfordville, Kentucky